Bertold Posselt was an Austrian luger who competed in the early 1910s. He won a bronze medal in the men's doubles event at the inaugural European championships of 1914 in Reichenberg, Bohemia (now Liberec, Czech Republic).

References
FIL-Luge.org list of European luge champions  - Accessed January 31, 2008.

Austrian male lugers
Year of birth missing
Year of death missing